The Military ranks of Belarus are the military insignia used by the Armed Forces of Belarus. Being a former member of Soviet Union, Belarus shares a rank structure similar to that of Russia. Belarus is a landlocked country, and does not possess a navy.

Commissioned officer ranks
The rank insignia of commissioned officers.

Other ranks
The rank insignia of non-commissioned officers and enlisted personnel.

References

External links
 

 
Belarus